Joe Sise (born 12 December 1989) is a Swedish footballer of Gambian descent, who either plays as a winger or forward.

Career
Starting his career in Snöstorp Nyhem FF, a minor club in the town of Halmstad, he took the step up in to the senior team in 2004 at the age of 15. In spring 2008 he went on loan to IFK Värnamo as he finished his studies at the local football gymnasium. During the summer transfer window Sise signed for local rivals Halmstads BK, making his debut against GIF Sundsvall on 24 October 2008, the game ending 0–0.

Prior to signing for Halmstads BK, Sise had been on trial with AC Milan and Manisaspor.

Following the end of the 2011 season, Sise announced he would not sign a new contract with Halmstads BK and follow the club in its relegation to Superettan. Following the end of Sise's contract he was made subject to speculation of where he would play next, in mid October a person named Can Arikboga, claimed to be Sise's agent and told German newspaper Bild that the player was soon signing for Hansa Rostock in 2. Bundesliga, however 2 days after the rumor arose Sise told the local newspaper Hallandsposten that Can Arikboga was not his agent and that he had no idea of who Arikboga was, stating that he been a victim of an agent fraud.

On 25 January 2012, the Danish club FC Nordsjælland announced that they had signed a 3-year contract with Joe Sise.

References

External links
  
  
 

1989 births
Living people
Swedish people of Gambian descent
Sportspeople from Halmstad
Swedish footballers
Sweden under-21 international footballers
Association football midfielders
Association football forwards
Allsvenskan players
Superettan players
IFK Värnamo players
Halmstads BK players
FC Nordsjælland players
Landskrona BoIS players
Swedish expatriate footballers
Expatriate men's footballers in Denmark
Swedish expatriate sportspeople in Denmark
Sportspeople from Halland County